The 2014 CPISRA Football 7-a-side American Cup was an American championship for men's national 7-a-side association football teams. CPISRA stands for Cerebral Palsy International Sports & Recreation Association. Athletes with a physical disability competed. The Championship took place in Canada from 19 to 26 September 2015.

Football 7-a-side was played with modified FIFA rules. Among the modifications were that there were seven players, no offside, a smaller playing field, and permission for one-handed throw-ins. Matches consisted of two thirty-minute halves, with a fifteen-minute half-time break. The Championships was a qualifying event for the 2015 IFCPF CP Football World Championships.

Participating teams and officials

Teams

The draw
During the draw, the teams were divided into pots because of rankings. Here, the following groups:

Squads
The individual teams contact following football gamblers on to:

Group A

Group B

Venues
The venues to be used for the World Championships were located in Toronto.

Format

The group stage was a competition between the 6 teams divided among two groups of three, where each group engaged in a round-robin tournament within itself.

The first-placed teams played in the final for the first place, the second place for the third place of the tournament and the last two fought for the fifth place.

Classification
Athletes with a physical disability competed. The athlete's disability was caused by a non-progressive brain damage that affects motor control, such as cerebral palsy, traumatic brain injury or stroke. Athletes must be ambulant.

Players were classified by level of disability.
C5: Athletes with difficulties when walking and running, but not in standing or when kicking the ball.
C6: Athletes with control and co-ordination problems of their upper limbs, especially when running.
C7: Athletes with hemiplegia.
C8: Athletes with minimal disability; must meet eligibility criteria and have an impairment that has impact on the sport of football.

Teams must field at least one class C5 or C6 player at all times. No more than two players of class C8 are permitted to play at the same time.

Group stage
The group stage, have seen the 6 teams divided into two groups of three teams.

Group A

Group B

Knockout stage

Semi-finals

Finals
Position 5-6

Position 3-4

Final

Statistics

Ranking

See also

References

External links
Cerebral Palsy International Sports & Recreation Association (CPISRA)
International Federation of Cerebral Palsy Football (IFCPF)

2014 in association football
2014
2014 in Canadian soccer
Paralympic association football